The Konduga massacre took place in Konduga, Borno State, Nigeria on 11 February 2014. The massacre was conducted by Boko Haram Islamists against Christian villagers. At least 62 people were killed.

Massacre
The massacre occurred on 11 February 2014 in Konduga, Borno State, northeastern Nigeria. The village where the attack occurred was predominantly Christian. Dressed in military gear, dozens of attackers raided the village. Some of their victims were shot; others had their throats slit. By the end of February 15, 2014, 121 people had been killed. The militants reportedly yelled Allahu Akbar while attacking the village, which is also a phrase used by other Islamist groups. The militants then continued to destroy homes and businesses in the town.

Subsequent events
On 15 February 2014, Boko Haram launched a similar style attack in Izghe, Borno. Over 121 people were killed in the attack. Thousands of villagers fled the town for the border with Cameroon in order to escape the violence. Survivors reported gunmen indiscriminately shooting everyone in their path, burned down the churches, and looted all the food.

Boko Haram militants then proceeded to attack the Nigerian Army, killing 9 soldiers and subsequently forcing the army to retreat from the area. The army would then proceed to launch large scale air and land raids on Boko Haram, forcing the militants to hide out in the forested areas.

On 6 May 2014, around 200 people were killed when insurgents, dressed in military uniforms, attacked Gamboru, a town in the state of Borno at the Nigeria-Cameroon border. The attackers stormed into the town when some of the residents were fast asleep and set ablaze houses while shooting at residents who tried to escape from the fire.

Boko Haram
Boko Haram is an jihadist terrorist group in Nigeria that is demanding to impose sharia law upon the entire country. Founded by Mohammed Yousuf, the group commonly bombs government buildings and churches in its militant attacks. The group is most active in the former territory of the Bornu Empire, now Borno State in northeastern Nigeria. Boko Haram launched its first terror attack in 2009, and have since been engaged in a low-intensity conflict against the Nigerian government, armed forces and inhabitants. Boko Haram is particularly vicious against Nigerian Christians, who they see as infidels living in their proposed Islamist state. BH had carried out massacres in villages prior to the Konduga massacre. The violence became so widespread that on 14 May 2013, Nigerian President Goodluck Jonathan declared a state of emergency in northern Nigeria and mobilized the army to battle the militants.

Other actions by Boko Haram include a mass shooting in 2013, a massacre in January 2014, battles in 2014 and 2015, as well as suicide bombings in 2018 and 2019.

References

2014 murders in Nigeria
2010s in Borno State
2014 mass shootings in Africa
2010s massacres in Nigeria
Attacks on buildings and structures in 2014
Attacks on buildings and structures in Nigeria 
Massacres perpetrated by Boko Haram
February 2014 crimes in Africa
February 2014 events in Nigeria
Mass murder in 2014
Islamic terrorist incidents in 2014
February 2014 massacre
Mass murder in Borno State
Massacres in 2014
Massacres of Christians
Mass shootings in Nigeria
Terrorist incidents in Borno State
Terrorist incidents in Nigeria in 2014
Attacks in Nigeria in 2014